Ban Dan is a district (amphoe) of Buriram province, northeastern Thailand.

History
The minor district (king amphoe) Ban Dan was created on 15 July 1996 by splitting four tambons from Mueang Buriram district.

On 15 May 2007, all 81 minor districts were upgraded to full districts. With publication in the Royal Gazette on 24 August the upgrade became official.

Geography
Neighboring districts are (from the north clockwise) Khaen Dong, Satuek, Huai Rat, Mueang Buriram and Khu Mueang.

Administration
The district is divided into four sub-districts (tambons), which are further subdivided into 59 villages (mubans). There are no municipal (thesaban) areas. There are a further four tambon administrative organizations.

References

External links
amphoe.com

Ban Dan